DISH (stylized as DISH//) is a Japanese pop/rock band and dance group managed by Stardust Promotion. The group is a dancing rock band, they show unique performances by dancing while playing instruments.

DISH// was formed on December 25, 2011 under Stardust Promotion as part of EBiDAN. On June 10, 2012 they officially debuted under Stardust Records with their Single "It's Alright". On June 19, 2013, DISH// had their major debut for single "I Can Hear" under Sony Music Records which was chosen as the 25th ending theme song for the anime, Naruto Shippūden . DISH// third major single, "Freak Show", was produced by Kenichi Maeyamada.

The group name DISH// stands for "Being everyone's main dish", because of their band name they started a tradition of throwing custom-made paper plates to their audience during their live performances. DISH// fandom name is //er (Slasher).

In January 2017, during their New Year Nippon Budokan concert, the band announced that former CustomiZ member Daichi Izumi will join DISH// as their drummer.

In 2020, they released "Neko (the First Take version)", which written by Aimyon, peaked No.11 in Japan Hot 100. Their fourth major label studio album, 2021's X, features collaborations with Glim Spanky, Haruko Nagaya from Ryokuōshoku Shakai, and JQ from Nulbarich.

2021 also saw the band sing "No.1", the first opening theme of the fifth season of the anime series My Hero Academia, and "Shout It Out", the theme song of the Japanese dub of the film Venom: Let There Be Carnage.

Members
Daichi Izumi (泉大智) - Drummer
Masaki Yabe (矢部昌暉) - Vocalist/Guitarist
Takumi Kitamura (北村匠海) - Vocalist/Guitarist
To-i Tachibana (橘柊生) - Rapper/DJ

Former Member(s):

• Kobayashi Ryuji (小林龍二) - Bassist

Discography

Studio albums

Compilation albums

Mini-albums

CD Singles

Digital Singles

Other singles

References

External links 
 

Japanese boy bands
Japanese pop rock music groups
Musical groups established in 2011
2011 establishments in Japan
Sony Music Entertainment Japan artists
Musical quartets
Stardust Promotion artists